Enn Klooren (21 June 1940 – 26 March 2011) was an Estonian actor.

Klooren was born in Tallinn and grew up in Türi. After graduating the Estonian Academy of Music and Theatre in 1968 Klooren worked in the Estonian Drama Theatre. Since 1989 he lived in Järva County where he among other things organized an amateur theatre.

Klooren has also played in several movies including Metskapten (1971), Toomas Nipernaadi (1983), Karoliine hõbelõng (1984), Tallinn pimeduses (1993), Jan Uuspõld läheb Tartusse (2007) and Kormoranid ehk nahkpükse ei pesta (2011).

Enn Klooren's brother Mati Klooren was also an actor.

Filmography

References

External links

1940 births
2011 deaths
Estonian male stage actors
Estonian male film actors
People from Türi
Male actors from Tallinn
20th-century Estonian male actors
21st-century Estonian male actors
Estonian Academy of Music and Theatre alumni